Your Choice Live Series 020 is an official live album containing material by The Notwist. It was recorded live at "Logo" in Hamburg / Germany by "Norddeutscher Rundfunk" on January 11, 1994 and the "Kulturstation" in Munich / Germany by Andy Jung on the February 26, 1993. "Unsaid Undone" was recorded live in the "Rock Radio B9" / Berlin in June 1993. Munich show mixed in December 1993 by Andy Jung at "Don´t come on Monday Studios" / Berlin.

Track listing

Personnel
The Notwist
Markus Acher - Guitar, vocals
Michael Acher - Bass
Mecki Messerschmidt -  Drums
Tobby Holzinger - Producer

External links 
 The Notwist Official Site
 Your Choice Records Official site
 The Devil, You + Me Official Site
 The Notwist at NPR Music
 www.alientransistor.de
 
 Concert photos in Roskilde Festival
 The Notwist at Pandora
 The Notwist at exclaim!
 The Notwist in Israel

1994 live albums
The Notwist albums